Kashipur is a block & tahasil in Rayagada district in the Indian state of Odisha. It is known for the Utkal Aluminium International Limited (UAIL)

History 
A civil unrest incident occurred on 1 December 2004, when the police led an attack on a demonstration in the village of Kucheipadar, near the proposed aluminum plant of Utkal Alumina International Limited at Doraguda.

Geography
Kashipur is 75 km west of Rayagada, and 452 km from Bhubaneswar. The district headquarters of Kalahandi is approximately 65 km from the main township.

Transport 
The nearest railway station is Tikiri and the nearest Airport is Jeypore.

It is connected by road to the major cities and towns of Odisha and Bhawanipatna Multiple options connect other cities of south Odisha, such as, Koraput, Berhampur and Nawarangpur.

Kashipur is surrounded by dense forests, and numerous cliffs, providing natural resources and scenic beauty. Cherkata waterfall is about 10 km from the township. Derakona waterfall is around 20 km away in the densely forested Sunger area, a proposed site of L&T Ltd. factories.

Offices
Government facilities include:

Block Headquarters office 
Police Station (Thana) 
Tahasil Office 
Post Office 
Community Health Centre (CHC)

Religion

 Lord Jagannath temple at the King's old palace.
 Maa Manikeswari temple
 Maa Thakurani temple 
 Lord Shiva temple 
 Lord Hanuman Temple

Festivals
Rath-yatra (The Cart Festival) attracts around 50,000 people celebrated in the Hindu Month of Ashadha (mid June – mid July).

During October, Dusshera Puja is celebrated. On the day of Vijayadashami there is a tradition of Lakha Mara (adopted for Maa Manikeswari from Kalahandi's Tradition)

Other festivals include Maha Shivaratri, Dipavali and Holi.

Demography
Jhodia, Kondha make up the majority of the 11,809 residents as per 2011 census, Odia is the predominant language. The total Block population is around 73,000.

See also 
 Kucheipadar tribal movement

References

External links
Official website of Rayagada district

Cities and towns in Rayagada district
Villages in Rayagada district